Naruto stable (鳴戸部屋 Naruto-beya) is a stable of sumo wrestlers, part of the Nishonoseki ichimon or group of stables, and founded by former sumo wrestler Kotoōshū Katsunori on 1 April 2017.

History
Naruto stable was established on 1 April 2017 by the Bulgarian-born former ōzeki Kotoōshū Katsunori, who branched out from Sadogatake stable. It is based in Sumida, Tokyo. One of the stable's early recruits was also a Bulgarian – former junior wrestling champion Ventsislav Katsarov (Torakio Daiki) who retired in April 2019 and returned to Bulgaria. The opening ceremony of the stable was attended by one hundred people including Kotoōshū's former stablemate Kotoshōgiku. Kotoōshū commented, "I want to nurture a wrestler who will eclipse me." As of January 2023 it has 17 wrestlers.

Kotoōshū became a naturalized Japanese citizen two months after his retirement in March 2014. His official name is Andō Karoyan. He is the first European-born stablemaster. He is also only the third foreign-born wrestler to open his own stable after Takamiyama and Musashimaru.

According to a report in May 2018, some wrestlers said that they chose Naruto stable because they had the most information when they searched the internet. Naruto stable is not related to Tagonoura stable which had the same name until 2013.

Naruto-oyakata suspended one of his wrestlers (reported to be a 20 year old sandanme level wrestler) from the January 2019 tournament after it emerged he had choked a more junior wrestler as a punishment. This is the first time the Compliance Committee and the Anti-Violence Provisions, which were established in December 2018, were applied. On February 19, 2019, an apology statement was posted on the official Twitter of Naruto stable "To all of you who always support us. This time, I was very sorry for the trouble that occurred in the stable. We will reflect firmly and take the disposition of the Sumo Association seriously, and will provide guidance and supervision to prevent this from happening in the future." and the official blog of Master Naruto.

However, in September 2021 the stable recruited Nichidai's Mongolian , who debuted the following November as a makushita tsukedashi entrant, and reached the jūryō division in May 2022, becoming the stable's first sekitori.

Ring name conventions
Several wrestlers at this stable have taken ring names or shikona which has the character , meaning Europe, as the first character. This is the middle character of the shikona of the stable's founder, former Kotoōshū (琴欧洲).

Owners
2017–present: 15th Naruto Katsunori (iin, former ōzeki Kotoōshū)

Notable active wrestlers

  (best rank jūryō)

Referee
Shikimori Komei (jonokuchi gyōji, real name Komei Hashimoto)

Usher
Kenta (jonokuchi yobidashi, real name Kenta Maeda)

Hairdresser 

 Tokoō (fifth class tokoyama, real name Baba Shiido)

Location
1 Chome-22-16 Mukōjima, Sumida-ku, Tōkyō-to 130-0003, Japan. It is nearby the Tokyo Skytree.

See also
List of sumo stables

References

External links
Naruto stable at the Japan Sumo Association
Official Site

Active sumo stables